Jennie Lillis Baranczyk (born Jennie Marie Lillis; February 22, 1982) is an American basketball coach who is the current head coach of the Oklahoma women's basketball team.

Early life and education
Born Jennie Marie Lillis in Cedar Rapids, Iowa, Jennie Baranczyk was raised in Urbandale, Iowa and attended Dowling Catholic High School in nearby West Des Moines. A communications major, Baranczyk attended the University of Iowa and played at forward on the Iowa Hawkeyes women's basketball team under head coach Lisa Bluder from 2000 to 2004. As a senior, Baranczyk averaged 16.0 points and 6.2 rebounds and was a second-team all-Big Ten selection. She also earned second-team All-Big Ten honors in 2002 and first-team honors in 2003, in addition to being a Women's Basketball Coaches Association Region 6 honorable mention All-American, and was an academic All-Big Ten honoree from 2002 to 2004. Baranczyk won the Big Ten's Medal of Honor for academic and athletic excellence upon graduating from Iowa in 2004.

Iowa statistics

Source

Coaching career
Baranczyk began her coaching career in 2004 at Kansas State under Deb Patterson and helped Kansas State win the 2006 WNIT. From 2006 to 2010, Baranczyk was an assistant at Marquette under Terri Mitchell, including Marquette's 2008 WNIT title. At Marquette, Baranczyk also helped with recruiting, game scheduling, opponent scouting, and public relations. The first hire on the new coaching staff, Baranczyk then was an assistant at Colorado under Linda Lappe beginning on May 10, 2010.

Drake
On April 17, 2012, Drake University in Des Moines, Iowa hired Baranczyk as head women's basketball coach. Drake went 11–20 in Baranczyk's first season and improved to 17–15 in the 2013–14 season. Baranczyk followed that season by leading Drake to a 20–11 record and the first round of the 2015 WNIT, the first postseason appearance in her tenure. In 2016, Drake improved to 23–10 and advanced to the second round of the WNIT.

The 2016–17 season was the most successful in Baranczyk's tenure, as Drake reached a 28–5 record that included a program and Missouri Valley Conference (MVC) record 22-game winning streak and 18–0 MVC record, the first team in the MVC to go undefeated in conference play. Drake won its first conference title since 2008 and first outright title since 2000. Drake went on to win the MVC tournament for the first time since 2007 and qualified for the NCAA tournament.

Oklahoma
Baranczyk was named head coach at Oklahoma on April 10, 2021, after nine years at Drake.

Personal life
Formerly Jennie Lillis, Baranczyk married Scott Baranczyk in 2009. They have three children. Jennie’s younger brother, Brian Lillis, was a 4-year starting point guard for The University of Albany, leading the team to two NCAA Tournament berths in 2006 and 2007.

Head coaching record

References

1982 births
Living people
American women's basketball coaches
Basketball coaches from Iowa
Colorado Buffaloes women's basketball coaches
Drake Bulldogs women's basketball coaches
Iowa Hawkeyes women's basketball players
Kansas State Wildcats women's basketball coaches
Marquette Golden Eagles women's basketball coaches
Oklahoma Sooners women's basketball coaches
People from Urbandale, Iowa
Sportspeople from Cedar Rapids, Iowa